Nine Muses may refer to:
 The nine Muses of Greek mythology
 Nine Muses (band), a South Korean girl group
 The Nine Muses, an elegiac volume of poetry published in 1700
 Nine letters written by Aeschines